Omphra is a genus of beetles in the family Carabidae.

Omphra are known in India and Sri Lanka.

Omphra Reiche is presented, based predominantly on the collections of the Museum für Naturkunde, Humboldt Universität, Berlin, Germany and Muséum National d'Histoire Naturelle, Paris, France. Six species are recognized, i.e., O. pilosa (Klug), O. complanata Reiche, O. hirta (Fabricius, O. rotundicollis Chaudoir, O. atrata (Klug), and O. rufipes (Klug), which are all known from India and Sri Lanka.

Species
The genus includes the following species:

 Omphra atrata (Klug, 1834)
 Omphra complanata Reiche, 1843
 Omphra hirta (Fabricius, 1801)
 Omphra pilosa Klug, 1834
 Omphra rotundicollis Chaudoir, 1872
 Omphra rufipes (Klug, 1834)

References

2.     A review of the genus Omphra Reiche 2012. Retrieved 2012-01-05

3.      Carabid beetle, Omphra pilosa Klug 1990. 

Anthiinae (beetle)